Egisto Tango (13 November 1873, in Rome – 5 October 1951, in Copenhagen) was an Italian conductor, whose premieres included The Wooden Prince and Bluebeard's Castle by Béla Bartók.

His career was launched in Venice and he conducted at La Scala and the New York Metropolitan Opera before accepting the job at the Budapest National Opera (1913-1919). According to Baker's, he moved to Copenhagen in 1929 (apparently first conducting there in 1927); according to Grove's he worked at the Volksoper in Vienna from 1925 to 1933.

According to the New York Tribune advertisement of 13 January 1910, Tango was the conductor during the first live-performance public radio broadcast.

References
Short bio in Hungarian
 Ödön Márffy: Portrait of Egisto Tango, 1917.

Notes

Italian conductors (music)
Italian male conductors (music)
1873 births
1951 deaths
Musicians from Rome
Italian emigrants to Denmark